Calliphora hilli is a blow fly species in the genus Calliphora.

References

External links

Calliphoridae
Insects described in 1925